Nationality words link to articles with information on the nation's poetry or literature (for instance, Irish or France).

Events
 April – The dictatorship in Portugal falls; in the six months prior, with increasing repression and a discouraging atmosphere, little new work has been published; yet later in the year, not much new poetry is published either as "writers who had based their style on censor-proof allusiveness and their themes on protest would now have to do some retooling".
 July 23 – The dictatorial Greek junta falls; start of the Metapolitefsi: exiled poets, authors and intellectuals return to the country to publish there.
 October 4 – While Ann Sexton is having lunch with her friend, fellow poet and collaborator Maxine Kumin to review Sexton's most recent book, The Awful Rowing Toward God, without a note or any warning, Sexton goes into her garage, starts the ignition of her car and dies of carbon monoxide poisoning.
 The Jack Kerouac School of Disembodied Poetics is founded by Allen Ginsberg and Anne Waldman.

Works published in English
Listed by nation where the work was first published and again by the poet's native land, if different; substantially revised works listed separately:

Australia
 Robert Gray, Creekwater Journal Australia
 
 Les Murray, Lunch and Counter Lunch, Australia

Canada
 George Bowering, In the Flesh
 Matt Cohen, Peach Melba
 A.M. Klein, The Collected Poems of A.M. Klein.Toronto; New York: McGraw-Hill Ryerson.
 Patrick Lane, Beware the Months of Fire
 Irving Layton, The Pole-Vaulter. Toronto: McClelland and Stewart.
 Irving Layton, Seventy-five Greek Poems, 1951-1974. Athens: Hermias Publications.
 Dennis Lee, Not Abstract Harmonies But. Vancouver: Kanchenjunga Press
 Gwendolyn MacEwen, Magic Animals: Selected Poems Old and New. Toronto: Macmillan. 
 Jay Macpherson, Welcoming Disaster: Poems, 1970-74. Toronto: Saannes Publications.
 P. K. Page, Poems Selected and New, selected and edited by Margaret Atwood
 Joe Rosenblatt, Blind Photographer. Press Porcepic.
 Raymond Souster, Change-Up: New Poems. Ottawa: Oberon Press.
 Raymond Souster and Douglas Lochhead, eds. 100 Poems of Nineteenth Century Canada. Toronto: Macmillan.
 Annie Szumigalski, Woman Reading in the Bath
 George Woodcock, editor, Poets and Critics: Essays from Canadian Literature 1966-1974, Toronto: Oxford University Press, scholarship

India, in English
 Shiv Kumar, Cobwebs in the Sun(Poetry in English),
 Keki N. Daruwalla:
 Apparition in April ( Poetry in English ), Calcutta: Writers Workshop, India.
 Crossing of Rivers ( Poetry in English ), New Delhi: Oxford University Press
 G. S. Sharat Chandra, Once or Twice (Poetry in English), Hippopotamus Press
 Syed Ameeruddin, The Dreadful Doom to Come and Other Poems, Madras: Poet Press India.

Ireland
 Austin Clarke, Collected Poems, including "The Lost Heifer", "The Young Woman of Beare", "The Planter's Daughter", "Celibacy", "Martha Blake", "The Straying Student", "Penal Law", "St Christopher", "Early Unfinished Sketch", "Martha Blake at Fifty-One", and "Tiresias" (died this year)
 Padraic Fallon, Poems (see also Poems and Versions 1983, Collected Poems 1990) Irish poet published in the United Kingdom
 John Montague, editor, The Faber Book of Irish Verse anthology (Faber and Faber) published in the United Kingdom
 Richard Murphy, High Island, including "Seals at High Island" and "Stormpetrel", Irish poet published in the United Kingdom
 Richard Ryan, Ravenswood Irish poet published in the United Kingdom

New Zealand
 Fleur Adcock, The Scenic Route, London and New York: Oxford University Press (New Zealand poet who moved to England in 1963)
 James K. Baxter, posthumous:
 The Tree House, poems for children
 The Labyrinth: Some Uncollected Poems 1944–72, edited by J. E. Weir
 Charles Brasch: Home Ground: Poems, Christchurch: Caxton Press (published posthumously)
 Allen Curnow, Collected Poems 1933–73
 Kendrick Smithyman, The Seal in the Dolphin Pool, Auckland: Auckland University Press and Oxford University Press
 Ian Wedde, Made Over

United Kingdom
 Dannie Abse, A Poet in the Family
 Fleur Adcock, The Scenic Route, New Zealand native living in and published in the United Kingdom
 Sir John Betjeman, A Nip in the Air
 W. H. Auden, Thank You, Fog (posthumous)
 Alasdair Clayre, A Fire by the Sea
 Donald Davie, The Shires
 Carol Ann Duffy, Fleshweathercock and Other Poems Outposts
 Douglas Dunn, Love or Nothing
 Odysseas Elytis, two English translations: The Axion Esti (trans. Edmund Keeley and G. Savidis) and The Sovereign Sun (trans. Kinom Friar)
 Padraic Fallon, Poems (see also Poems and Versions 1983, Collected Poems 1990)
 Flora Garry, Bennygoak and Other Poems.
 William R. P. George - Grawn Medi
 Karen Gershon, My Daughters, My Sisters
 Robin Hamilton, Poems
 John Heath-Stubbs, Artorius: A Heroic Poem in Four Books and Eight Episodes
 Tom Holt, Poems by Tom Holt
 Linton Kwesi Johnson, Voices of the Living and the Dead
 David Jones, The Sleeping Lord and Other Fragments
 Jenny Joseph, Rose in the afternoon, and Other Poems
 Susanne Knowles, The Sea-Bell and Other Poems
 Philip Larkin, High Windows
 Laurence Lerner, A.R.T.H.U.R. (see also A.R.T.H.U.R. & M.A.R.T.H.A. 1980)
 Edward Lucie-Smith, The Well-Wishers
 John Montague (ed.), The Faber Book of Irish Verse (Faber and Faber)
 Richard Murphy, High Island
 John Pudney, Selected Poems, 1967-1973
 Peter Reading, For the Municipality's Elderly
 Richard Ryan, Ravenswood
 Jon Silkin, The Principle of Water
 Alan Sillitoe, Storm: New Poems, London: W.H. Allen, 
 Joan Murray Simpson, In High Places
 C. H. Sisson, In the Trojan Ditch, collected poems and selected translations
 Iain Crichton Smith, Notebooks of Robinson Crusoe
 John Stallworthy, The Apple Barrel
 R. S. Thomas:
 Selected Poems, 1946-1968
 What is a Welshman?
 Anthony Thwaite, New Confessions
 Andrew Young, Complete Poems (posthumous)

United States
 Ai, Cruelty
 A.R. Ammons, Sphere: The Form of a Motion
 Ted Berrigan, The Drunken Boat
 Joseph Payne Brennan:
 Death Poems
 Edges of Night
 Ed Dorn:
 Recollections of Gran Apacheria, Turtle Island
 Slinger (contains Gunslinger, Books I-IV and "The Cycle"), Wingbow Press
 Jill Hoffman, Mink Coat
 Galway Kinnell, The Avenue Bearing the Initial of Christ into the New World
 Judith Kroll, In the Temperate Zone
 James Merrill: "Lost in Translation", one of the most studied and celebrated of his shorter works, was originally published in The New Yorker magazine on April 8, and published in his 1976 book Divine Comedies.
 Michael Palmer, The Circular Gates (Black Sparrow Press)
 George Quasha, Word-Yum: Somapoetics 64-69: Seventh Series
 James Reiss, The Breathers (Ecco Press)
 Charles Reznikoff, By the Well of Living & Seeing: New & Selected Poems 1918-1973
 Michael Ryan, Threats Instead of Trees (Yale University Press)
 Anne Sexton, The Death Notebooks
 Gary Snyder, Turtle Island
 Reed Whittemore, The Mother's Breast and the Father's House

Anthologies
 George Quasha (with Susan Quasha), An Active Anthology (Sumac Press)

Translations in the United States
 Ernesto Cardenal, translated from Spanish, Homage to the American Indians
 W. S. Merwin and Clarence Brown, translation, Osip Mandelstam: Selected Poems, New York: Oxford University Press (reprinted in 2004 as The Selected Poems of Osip Mandelstam, New York: New York Review of Books)
 Michael Smith, translator, Trilice, from the original Spanish of César Vallejo
 J. M. Cohen, translator, Sent off the Field from the original Spanish of Fuera del juego by Heberto Padilla

Other
 Christopher Hope, Cape Drives (South Africa)

Works published in other languages
Listed by nation where the work was first published and again by the poet's native land, if different; substantially revised works listed separately:

Denmark
 Poul Borum, Sang til dagens glæde
 Jørgen Gustava Brandt, Her omkring
 Klaus Høeck, Transformations, publisher: Gyldendal
 Henrik Nordbrandt, Opbrud og ankomster ("Departures and Arrivals"), Copenhagen: Gylandal, 72 pages
 Vagn Steen, Fuglens flugt i halvkrystal

French language

Canada, in French
 Rémi-Paul Forgue, Poèmes du vent et des ombres
 Michel Garneau, Moments
 Jean Royer, La parole me vient de ton corps suivi de Nos corps habitables: Poèmes, 1969-1973, Montréal: Nouvelles éditions de l'Arc

France
 Anne-Marie Albiach, "HII" linéaires
 Michel Béguey, Par des chemins secrets
 Maurice Courant, O toi que le vent glace
 Philippe Denis, Cabier d'ombres
 Pierre Emmanuel, Sophia
 Claude Fourcade, Le Florilège poétique
 Roger Giroux, Voici, published posthumously (died 1973)
 Eugène Guillevic, encoches
 Philippe Jaccottet, Chant d'en bas
 Patrice de La Tour du Pin, Psaumes de tous mes temps
 Jean Lebrau, Singles
 Jean-Claude Renard, Le Dieu de nuit
 Robert Mallet, Quand le mirior s'etonne
 Pierre Menanteau, Capitale du souvenir
 Alain Veinstein, Répétition sur l'amas

Criticism, scholarship and biography in France
 Jean Follain, Collège, memoirs
 Pierre Segher, La Résistance et ses poètes

Other, in French
 Andrée Sodenkamp La Fête debout (Belgium)

German language

West Germany
 Jürgen Becker, Das Ende der Landschaftsmalerei
 Erich Fried, Gegengift
 Hermann Kesten, Ich bin der ich bin

Hebrew
 N. Alterman, Regayim (posthumous)
 T. Carmi, Hitnatzlut ha-Mechaber
 Haim Gouri, Mar`ot Gihazi ("Gehazi Visions"), Israel
 Y. Lerner, Shirim
 N. Sach, Mivhar
 H. Schimmel, Shirai Malon Zion
 A Shllonsky, Sefer ha-Sulamot (posthumous)
 N. Stern, Bain Arpilim
 M. Wieseltier, Kach

Hungary
 György Petri, Körülírt zuhanás

India
In each section, listed in alphabetical order by first name:

Bengali
 Debarati Mitra, Indian, Bengali-language:
 Andha Skoole Ghanta Baje. Kolkata: Satarupa
 Amar Putul, Kolkata: Satarupa
 Nirendranath Chakravarti, Khola Muthi, Kolkata: Aruna Prokashoni; Bengali-language

Other in India
 Jayant Kaikini,  Rangadindostu doora, Sagar, Karnataka: Akshara Prakashana, Indian, Kannada-language poet, short-story writer, and screen writer
 K. Satchidanandan, Atmagita ("The Song of the Self"); Malayalam-language
 Niranjan Bhagat, Yantravijnan and Mentrakavita, criticism; Gujarati-language
 Sitanshu Yashaschandra, Odysseusnu-n Halesu, Mumbai and Ahmedabad: R R Sheth & Co.; Gujarati-language
 Thangjam Ibopishak Singh, Shingnaba ("Challenge") (Co-authored), Imphal: Authors; Meitei language

Portuguese language

Brazil
 Francisco Alvim, Passatempo
 Geraldo Carneiro, Na Busca do Sete-Estrelo
 Ledo Ivo, O Sinal Semafórico (posthumous)
 Stella Leonardos:
 Amanhecéncia
 Romançário
 Ariano Suassuna, A Farsa da Boa Preguiça

Portugal
 Ruy de Moura Belo, A margem da alegria ("The Riverbank of Happiness")
 Fiama Brandão, collected verse, with additions
 Fernando Echevarria, A Base e o Timbre
 Egito Gonçalves, Destruição: Dois Pontos
 Herberto Helder, collected poems to date
 Jorge de Sena, Conheço o Sal
 Pedro Támen, Os 42 Sonetos

Russian
 M. Kanoatov, The Voice of Stalingrad (translated into Russian from Tajik), 1973
 M. Lukonin, Frontline Verse
 Aleksandr Solzhenitsyn Prussian Nights (finished in 1951), published in the original Russian in Paris
 L. Tatyanichev, The Honey Season

Sweden
 Reidar Ekner, Efter flera tusen rad
 Lars Forssell, Det möjiliga
 Gunnar Harding and Rolf Aggestam, editors, Tjugo unga poeter, an anthology of modern poetry
 Lars Norén, Dagliga och nattliga dikter
 Tomas Tranströmer, Baltics (Östersjöar)

Yiddish
 Pinche Berman, Love
 Moshe Brodersohn, The Last Song (posthumous)
 Meir Charatz:
 Heaven and Earth
 In Strange Paradise
 Eliezer Greenberg, Memorabilia
 Shifrah Kholodenko, The Word
 Rachel Kramf, Clouds Wish to Cry
 Saul Maltz, Poems of My Profound Belief
 Joseph Mlotek and Eleanor Mlotek, editors, Pearls from Yiddish Poetry (anthology), poems printed in the Sunday editions of the New York Jewish Daily Forward
 Roza Nevadovska, Poems of Mine (posthumous)
 Hillel Shargel, A Window to Heaven
 Abraham Sutzkever, The Fidlerose
 Malka H. Tuzman, Under Your Mark
 Freed Weininger, In the Wide Outside
 Isaac Yanosovich, The Other Side of Wonder
 Hersh Leib Young, In the Astral Spheres

Spanish Language

Spain
 Vicente Aleixandre, Diálogos del conocimiento
 Matilde Camus, Templo del Alba ("Temple of Dawn")

Latin America
 Pablo Neruda:
 La rosa separada
 Jardín de invierno
 Defectos escogidos
 2000 El corazón amarillo
 Libro de las preguntas
 Elegía
 El mar y las campanas
 Efraín Huerta, Los eróticos y otros poemas (Mexico)
 Elvio Romero, Antología poética 1947-73, second edition (Paraguay)
 Luis Cardoza y Aragón, Quinta estación

Other
 Odysseas Elytis, Τα Ετεροθαλή ("Step-Poems") Greece
 Luo Fu, Magical Songs, Chinese (Taiwan)

Awards and honors

Canada
 See 1974 Governor General's Awards for a complete list of winners and finalists for those awards.

United Kingdom
 Cholmondeley Award: D.J. Enright, Vernon Scannell, Alasdair Maclean
 Eric Gregory Award: Duncan Forbes, Roger Garfitt, Robin Hamilton, Frank Ormsby, Penelope Shuttle
 Queen's Gold Medal for Poetry: Ted Hughes

United States
 Consultant in Poetry to the Library of Congress (later the post would be called "Poet Laureate Consultant in Poetry to the Library of Congress"): Stanley Kunitz appointed this year.
 Frost Medal: John Hall Wheelock
 National Book Award for Poetry, Allen Ginsberg, The Fall of America: Poems of these States, 1965-1971 and Adrienne Rich, Diving into the Wreck: Poems 1971–1972
 Pulitzer Prize for Poetry: Robert Lowell, The Dolphin
 Fellowship of the Academy of American Poets: Léonie Adams

French language

France
 French Academy: Grand Prix de la Poésie: Philippe Soupault

Births
 September 20 – Owen Sheers, Fijian-born Welsh poet, novelist and journalist
 September 25 – Scott Ransopher, American poet
 William Allegrezza, American poet
 Sasha Dugdale, English poet and translator
 Choman Hardi, Kurdish poet, translator and painter

Deaths
Birth years link to the corresponding "[year] in poetry" article:
 January 20 – Edmund Blunden (born 1896), English poet, author and critic
 February 4 – Ozaki Kihachi 尾崎喜八 (born 1892), Japanese, Shōwa period poet
 February 20 – Matilde Hidalgo (born 1889), Ecuadorian physician, poet and women's rights activist
 March 19 – Austin Clarke, Irish poet, novelist and playwright
 April 18 – Eric Roach (born 1915), Tobagonian poet, suicide
 June 9 – Miguel Ángel Asturias, 74, Guatemalan poet, author, writer, journalist and diplomat
 July 5 – John Crowe Ransom, 86, American poet, editor and academic critic
 July 11 – Pär Lagerkvist, 83, Swedish poet, author, playwright, writer and winner of the Nobel Prize in Literature in 1951
 July 24 – Parker Tyler, 70, American film critic and poet
 August 22 – Jacob Bronowski, 66, Polish-born English polymath and poet
 September 6 – Julian Davis, 72, American
 September 15 – Ikuma Arishima, 有島生馬 pen-name (together with Utosei and then Jugatsutei) of Arishima Mibuma (born 1882), Japanese novelist, poet and painter; member of the Shirakaba literary circle
 October 4 – Anne Sexton, 45, American poet, suicide;
 October 9 – Padraic Fallon, 69, Irish (see "Works published in English" section, above)
 October 16 – Edasseri Govindan Nair (born 1906), Indian, Malayalam-language poet
 October 21 – Kaoru Maruyama 丸山 薫 (born 1899) Japanese
 October 28 – David Jones, 78, English poet and artist
 December 16 – Kostas Varnalis (born 1884), Greek
 Also:
 Buddhadeb Bosu (born 1908), Bengali
 Paula Ludwig (born 1900), German

See also

 Poetry
 List of poetry awards
 List of years in poetry

Notes

 Britannica Book of the Year 1975 ("for events of 1974"), published by Encyclopædia Britannica 1975 (source of many items in "Works published" section and rarely in other sections)

20th-century poetry
Poetry